Schuurmansia is a genus of flowering plants belonging to the family Ochnaceae.

Its native range is Malesia to Papuasia.

Species:

Schuurmansia elegans 
Schuurmansia henningsii 
Schuurmansia vidalii

References

Ochnaceae
Malpighiales genera